Adrian Zahra (born 24 September 1990) is an Australian professional footballer who plays for National Premier League club Heidelberg United.

Career

Melbourne Knights
Zahra started his career being coached by Billy Vojtek in the youth system of Melbourne Knights before progressing to the senior side for the 2007–08 season. He played nearly every game for the Knights in 2008 off the bench, but was soon loaned out to Western Suburbs SC in 2009 in the league below, the Victorian State League Division 1. In 2010, Zahra returned to the Knights and capped off a sensational year with the club by receiving the 2010 Victorian Premier League U21 Player of the Year Award.

Melbourne Heart
While still with Melbourne Knights, Zahra made a trial appearance for new A-League side Melbourne Heart, in an exhibition match against Premier League team Everton on 14 July 2010, which Heart lost 2–0. Melbourne Heart went on to sign Zahra midway through their inaugural 2010-11 A-League season on a short-term contract upon the completion of the 2010 Victorian Premier League season. His contract was originally four weeks in length. He made his début for the Heart in October 2010, in the first ever Melbourne derby. After an extended trial period, in which he scored two goals for Heart, he was signed by the club in December for an extra two years, his contract starting at the beginning of the 2011–12 season.

His season was cut short after an infamous incident during the third Melbourne derby on 22 January 2011. He was tackled by Melbourne Victory's Kevin Muscat late in the game, which made worldwide headlines. As a result, Zahra sustained a serious knee injury in his right leg. Muscat received a red card for the tackle and was subsequently handed an 8-match ban. Zahra was substituted out of the match, being unable to continue playing. He missed the remainder of the season due to the injury. Surgery was required on his knee.

Perth Glory
On 27 April 2012, Zahra signed with the Perth Glory. He made eight appearances for Perth in his first season there, including one goal against Adelaide United in Round 27. The following season, Zahra made 10 appearances, scoring two goals. After the completion of his contract at the end of the 2013–14 season, Zahra left the Glory.

Valletta
Zahra then signed his first overseas contract, penning a deal with Maltese side Valletta. His stay there was only short lived, making five appearances and scoring two goals before being released in early December 2014.

NPL Victoria
Zahra's return to Melbourne Knights FC was confirmed by the club on 16 February 2015, days before the start of the 2015 NPL Victoria season. The winger left the Knights in mid-2015 to sign for NPL Victoria rivals Port Melbourne SC. At Port Melbourne, Zahra made 33 appearances and netted two goals. He left Port Melbourne at the end of the 2016 season to sign with league heavyweights Heidelberg United FC for the 2017 season.

Personal life
Zahra is of Maltese, Italian descent. He attended high school at Penola Catholic College.

References

External links
Adrian Zahra video press interview on The World Game (SBS)
Heart TV interview with Adrian Zahra interview with Zahra on Melbourne Heart's official YouTube channel

1990 births
Living people
Association football midfielders
Melbourne Knights FC players
Melbourne City FC players
Australian people of Maltese descent
Australian people of Italian descent
A-League Men players
Perth Glory FC players
Valletta F.C. players
Soccer players from Melbourne
National Premier Leagues players
Port Melbourne SC players
Australian expatriate soccer players
Heidelberg United FC players
Australian soccer players